Scottland may refer to:

Scottland, Illinois, an unincorporated community in Edgar County, Illinois, United States
Scottland, Alabama, in Bullock County, Alabama, United States
Beethaeven Scottland, (1975–2001), American professional boxer

See also
Scotland
Scotland (disambiguation)